This article is the list of international matches of the South Korea national under-23 football team from 1991 to 1999.

Results by year

Under-23 matches

1991

Source:

1992

Source:

1994

Source:

1995

Source:

1996

Source:

1999

Source:

Other matches

See also
 South Korea national under-23 football team results

References

External links
 South Korea U-23 (Olympic) Matches - Details 1991-1999 at YANSFIELD
 Men's U-23 Squads & Results at KFA

1991